List of Colorado amphibians lists the wild salamanders, frogs, and toads found in the U.S. state of Colorado.

Salamanders

Frogs

*Although it bears the common name "toad", Gastrophryne olivacea is taxonomically considered to be a frog.

†Bullfrogs are an introduced and invasive species to Colorado.

Toads

References

External links
List of Threatened and Endangered species in Colorado

Amphibians
Colorado